Piikkiö, is a former municipality of Finland. Piikkiö was consolidated with Kaarina on 1 January 2009.

It is located in the province of Western Finland and is part of the Southwest Finland region. The municipality had a population of 6,836 in December 2004 and covered an area of 90.35 km2 (excluding sea) of which 0.07 km2 is inland water. The population density was 75.72 inhabitants per km2.

The municipality was almost unilingually Finnish.

Notable individuals 
 Mikael Agricola, clergyman and de facto inventor of written Finnish
 Fredrika Bremer, Swedish writer and feminist
 Jenni Dahlman, former model and winner of the 2001 Miss Scandinavia contest
 Leena Lander, author
 Artturi Lehkonen, ice hockey player
 Mika Lipponen, footballer
 Sami Salo, ice hockey player
 Timo Salonen, rally driver and the 1985 world champion for Peugeot
 Yrjö Sirola, politician and writer
 Liisa Veijalainen, orienteer

External links

Official website 

Former municipalities of Finland
Kaarina
Populated places disestablished in 2009
2009 disestablishments in Finland